Coptosia compacta is a species of beetle in the family Cerambycidae. It was described by Édouard Ménétries in 1832, originally under the genus Saperda. It is known from Israel, Iran, Syria, Armenia, Jordan, and Turkey.

Subspecies
 Coptosia compacta compacta (Ménétries, 1832)
 Coptosia compacta sancta (Reiche, 1877)

References

Saperdini
Beetles described in 1832